Lágrimas, Risas y Amor (Tears, Laughter and Love) was a romantic Mexican comic book published by Editorial Argumentos (EDAR), probably the most popular of its kind in Latin America and one of the most popular of all the media in Mexico. Many of the stories from their comics were adapted into film and television.

References
Tatum, Charles M.  Lagrimas, risas y amor: Mexico's Most Popular Romance Comic Book, The Journal of Popular Culture 03/2004; 14(3):413 – 423. DOI:10.1111/j.0022-3840.1980.1403_413.x
De Valdés, Rosalva La historia de los comics mexicanos: El progreso de la industria y de la aceptación del arte gráfico-narrativo, vol. iv, issue 43, Barcelona, 1984, pp. 1199–1204.

External links
Lágrimas, Risas y Amor – facebook page

Mexican comics
Romance comics